Valerie Anne Mars (born 20 January 1959) is an American billionaire heiress and businesswoman. As of June 2021, Bloomberg Billionaires Index estimated her wealth to be $11.5 billion.

Valerie Mars is a fourth generation member of the Mars family. Her father was late Forrest Mars Jr. (1931–2016). She has three sisters: Marijke Mars, Pamela Mars-Wright and Victoria B. Mars. She inherited about 8 percent stake of Mars Inc. in 2016, which made her a billionaire.

She earned a bachelor's degree from Yale University and an MBA from Columbia University. She is married to Philip Michael White (since 1984), and has two sons.

She is a senior vice president and head of corporate development for Mars, Inc. Since 2014 she has served as a board member of Fiat Chrysler Automobiles. She serves also as a board member of Ahlstrom-Munksjö, a Finnish-Swedish stock company (paper industry). She is member of the advisory board of Rabobank North America. Her participation in nonprofit organizations include board membership in Conservation International (nature protection) and the Open Space Institute (landscape protection, honorary trustee).

References

Living people
1959 births
Yale University alumni
Columbia Business School alumni
Mars family
American billionaires
Female billionaires